Tisis sabahensis is a moth in the family Lecithoceridae. It was described by Kyu-Tek Park in 2003. It is found on Sabah, Malaysia's easternmost state.

The wingspan is about 26 mm. The forewings are light orange with a dark brown leaden-metallic streak at the base and a median dark brown area, as well as a more or less crescent leaden-metallic band, starting from the base, running along the costa and extending to the lower margin of the cell, followed by a broad light brown streak running to the apex below the costa. There are several light brown transverse lines along the veins.

Etymology
The species name refers to the type locality, Sabah.

References

Moths described in 2003
Tisis